James Trujillo, better known by his stage name Jay Tee, is a rapper, songwriter and hip hop producer from Vallejo, CA. He has been a part of the city's scene since the early 1990s as the lead member of N2Deep and Latino Velvet along with Baby Beesh. Even though N2Deep's 2000 album Slightly Pimpish/Mostly Doggish was a solo album, it was not until 2001 that Jay Tee released a solo album under his own name, So Cold.

Latino Velvet was originally composed of Jay Tee and Baby Beesh in 1997 on the album Latino Velvet Project.  Although the album featured several tracks with Frost and Don Cisco, it was not until 2000 that they were featured on the cover with equal billing to Jay Tee and Baby Beesh. Velvet City featured several west coast artists including: E-40, Levitti, Rappin' 4-Tay, Bosko, Cool Nutz and the Mary Jane Girls.

Jay Tee is the founder and owner of 40 Ounce Records. Jay Tee has remained an underground presence in The Bay Area since his debut almost two decades ago.

Discography

Studio albums
So Cold (2001)
High Caliber (2002)
A Cold Piece of Work (2005)
The Thousandaire (2005)
How the Game Go (2006)
A.K.A. Jaime Trago (2008)
Money in the Streets (2010)
The Game is Cold (2013)
Vallejo Mentality (2014)
End of an Era (2021)

with N2Deep
Back to the Hotel (1992)
24-7-365 (1994)
The Golden State (1997)
The Rumble (1998)
Slightly Pimpish/Mostly Doggish (2000)
The Movement (2008)

with Latino Velvet
Latino Velvet Project (1997)
Velvet City (2000)
Menudo Mix (2004)
The Camp Is Back (hosted by Chingo Bling) (2007)
The Best of Latino Velvet (2008)

Collaboration albums
Negotiations with Free Agents (2002)
Velvetism with Baby Beesh (2002)
Out Here Hustlin''' with Young Dru (2007)M.S.U. with Baby Beesh (2012)

Compilation albumsPlayas Association - Tha Bomb Bay (1996)Playas Association Vol. 2 - Full Time Hustlin (1998)The Knocks 1992–2000 (2001)40 Ounce Records Hardest Hits: 10 Years in the Game '92-'02 (2001)Playas Association Vol. 3 - The Product (2001)Playas Association Vol. IV - Northwest Hustlin (2002)Bayriderz, Vol. 3: Kalifornia: State of Emergency with B-12 (2002)On One: The 40 Ounce Album & Mixtape (2004)Everybody Ain't Able with Mac Dre (2007)Appearances Volume 1 (2008)Appearances Volume 2 (2009)Bay to Santa Fe (2011)

MixtapesHe Got Game'' (hosted by Insane Mixaken) (2005)

Guest appearances

See also 
List of Chicano rappers

References

External links 
 MySpace Page
 Artistdirect Page
 40 Ounce Records
 Vimeo Page

Year of birth missing (living people)
Living people
American rappers of Mexican descent
Musicians from Vallejo, California
Rappers from the San Francisco Bay Area
Underground rappers
American hip hop record producers
Gangsta rappers
21st-century American rappers
Record producers from California